Alfred John Gardyne Drummond de Chastelain  (born 30 July 1937) is a British-Canadian retired army officer and diplomat.

De Chastelain was born in Romania to Scottish and American parents and was educated in England and Scotland before his family emigrated to Canada in 1954. There, de Chastelain became a Militia private and enrolled in the Royal Military College of Canada, going on to pursue a career in the Canadian Army.  He was commissioned into Princess Patricia's Canadian Light Infantry and rose eventually to be twice Chief of the Defence Staff, with a break of a year during which he served as Canada's ambassador to the United States. In 1995, de Chastelain became active in the Northern Ireland peace process and eventually focused on the disarmament of paramilitary groups in Northern Ireland.

Early life and education
De Chastelain was born in 1937 in Bucharest, Romania, to Alfred Gardyne de Chastelain, a Scottish oil engineer then working in Bucharest for British Petroleum, (later an agent of SOE) and Marion Elizabeth de Chastelain, an American. He was educated in England and later at Fettes College, Edinburgh. The de Chastelain family emigrated to Canada in 1954, and a year later, after finishing his education at Fettes College, De Chastelain joined his family and attended Mount Royal College (now Mount Royal University) in Calgary. He married Mary Ann Laverty.

Military

De Chastelain started his military career as a Militia private in the Calgary Highlanders in which he served from January to September 1956. He was enrolled in the Royal Military College of Canada in September 1956 and graduated in 1960 with a Bachelor of Arts degree in history and a commission in Princess Patricia's Canadian Light Infantry (PPCLI), two years before he became a naturalized Canadian. Performing regimental duty in Canada, Germany, and Cyprus, de Chastelain subsequently attended the British Army staff college in Camberley in 1966 and was commanding officer of the Second Battalion PPCLI from 1970 to 1972.

As a colonel, he commanded CFB Montreal for a two-year period ending with the 1976 Summer Olympics in that city. He was also Deputy Chief of Staff of the United Nations Force in Cyprus (UNFICYP) and Commander of the Canadian contingent there. As a brigadier-general, he successively became Commandant of the Royal Military College of Canada in 1977, Commander of 4 Canadian Mechanized Brigade Group in Lahr, Germany in 1980 and Director General Land Doctrine and Operations at National Defence Headquarters in Ottawa, Ontario in 1982.

As a major-general, de Chastelain was Deputy Commander of the Canadian Army (then called Mobile Command) and Commander of the Mobile Command Division, which was exercised as such in 1985 on Exercise RV '85. As a lieutenant-general, he became Assistant Deputy Minister for Personnel in 1986 and then Vice-Chief of the Defence Staff in 1988. In 1989, he was promoted to the rank of general and appointed Chief of the Defence Staff.

In 1993, he transferred to the Reserves and was appointed Ambassador to the United States by Brian Mulroney. In 1994, shortly after the election of Jean Chrétien, he was recalled to Regular Force duty and re-appointed Chief of the Defence Staff, replacing Admiral Anderson and vacating the office of Ambassador for Raymond Chrétien. de Chastelain served as Chief of Defence Staff until his retirement in December 1995.

Civilian
Since November 1995, de Chastelain has been involved in the Northern Ireland peace process and from 1997 to 2011 he was Chairman of the Independent International Commission on Decommissioning, which was responsible for ensuring the decommissioning of arms by paramilitary groups in Northern Ireland. He has made an impact on the way that Britain has viewed the IRA since the decommissioning has begun. As part of the Good Friday Agreement an independent neutral adjudicator was selected to look over the disarmament of Republican and Loyalist paramilitary weapons in Northern Ireland.

Honours

In 1985, de Chastelain was appointed Commander of the Order of Military Merit and in 1991, Commander of the Order of St John; in 1993, he received the Commendation Medal of Merit and Honour of Greece, and was appointed Officer of the Order of Canada; in 1995, he was appointed Commander of the Legion of Merit (U.S.A.); in 1999, he was made a Companion of Honour; and in 2014, he was promoted to Companion of the Order of Canada. Archie Cairns composed a jig for bagpipes in his honour in 1992.

He has an honorary Doctor of Military Science degree from the Royal Military College of Canada, an honorary Doctor of Laws (Conflict Resolution) degree from Royal Roads University in British Columbia, an honorary Doctor of Education degree from Nipissing University, an honorary Doctor of Laws degree from Carleton University, an honorary Doctor of Laws degree from Queen's University, Kingston, an honorary Doctor of Civil Law degree from Saint Mary's University, Halifax, an honorary Doctor of Laws degree from Brock University, an honorary Doctor of Laws degree from Concordia University, an honorary Doctor of Laws degree from Mount Allison University and a Doctorate Honoris Causa from the University of Edinburgh.  He is also an Honorary Fellow of Lady Margaret Hall, Oxford. De Chastelain was a recipient of the Vimy Award in 1992.

References

External links
 
 IRA arms decommissioned

|-

1937 births
Living people
Chiefs of the Defence Staff (Canada)
Vice Chiefs of the Defence Staff (Canada)
Canadian Presbyterians
Canadian generals
Ambassadors of Canada to the United States
Canadian Members of the Order of the Companions of Honour
Commanders of the Order of St John
Commanders of the Legion of Merit
British emigrants to Canada
Canadian people of Scottish descent
Canadian people of American descent
Canadian Army officers
Companions of the Order of Canada
Royal Military College of Canada alumni
People educated at Fettes College
Fellows of Lady Margaret Hall, Oxford
Northern Ireland peace process
Commandants of the Royal Military College of Canada
Mount Royal University alumni
Graduates of the Staff College, Camberley
Commanders of the Order of Military Merit (Canada)
Canadian military musicians
Princess Patricia's Canadian Light Infantry officers
Calgary Highlanders
Calgary Highlanders soldiers